The Hazen Store is a small complex of buildings in Hazen, Nevada, listed on the National Register of Historic Places. The store provided a stopping point in a remote portion of U.S. Route 50 and served as a focal point in the small town of Hazen. The store was built in 1944 to replace an earlier store that was demolished to make way for a realignment of Route 50.

The property comprises the main store, a garage, and a bunkhouse formerly used by the Southern Pacific Railroad. The central portion of the structure dates to about 1904, operating at a different location as a saloon called Shorty's Bar until it was relocated in 1944.

The Hazen Store was listed on the National Register of Historic Places on January 28, 2002, as an illustration of a commercial property on the Reno Highway.

References

Commercial buildings completed in 1944
National Register of Historic Places in Churchill County, Nevada
Commercial buildings on the National Register of Historic Places in Nevada